Paul Dauenhauer (born 1980), a chemical engineer and MacArthur Fellow,  is the Lanny & Charlotte Schmidt Professor at the University of Minnesota (UMN).  He is recognized for his research in catalysis science and engineering, especially, his contributions to the understanding of the catalytic breakdown of cellulose to renewable chemicals, the invention of oleo-furan surfactants, and the development of catalytic resonance theory and programmable catalysts.

Early life and education
Paul Dauenhauer was born in 1980 in Texas, USA, and was raised in Wisconsin Rapids, WI, attending Lincoln High School. He received his bachelor's degree in chemical engineering and chemistry at the University of Wisconsin, Madison in 2004. Working under the supervision of Lanny Schmidt at the University of Minnesota, Dauenhauer received his Ph.D. in chemical engineering in 2008 from the Department of Chemical Engineering & Materials Science. His dissertation described the development of reactive flash volatilization and was titled "Millisecond autothermal catalytic reforming of carbohydrates for synthetic fuels by reactive flash volatilization".

Career
Following graduation from Minnesota, Dauenhauer served as a senior research engineer at the Dow Chemical Company in Midland, MI, and Freeport, TX.  He started as an assistant professor at the University of Massachusetts, Amherst in 2009 before promotion to associate professor in 2014.  In 2014, he moved to the Department of Chemical Engineering & Materials Science (CEMS) at the University of Minnesota, where he was promoted to professor, and then appointed Lanny Schmidt Honorary Professor in 2019.  During this time, he co-founded or contributed to the founding of startup companies Activated Research Company, Sironix Renewables, and enVerde, LLC.

Renewable chemicals
Dauenhauer's focus on renewable chemicals produced from glucose has targeted both drop-in replacement chemicals and new chemicals with novel characteristics.  In 2012, he discovered a high yield pathway to synthesize p-xylene from glucose; this molecule is the key ingredient in polyethylene terephthalate plastic.  This process technology utilized a new class of weak acid zeolites that permits the manufacture of biorenewable polyester.

In 2015, Dauenhauer and his team developed a new class of surfactants, detergents, and soaps that are derived from biomass (furans from sugars and fatty acids from triglycerides), oleo-furan sulfonates (OFS).  These molecules were shown to have high hard water stability (>1000 ppm Ca++) and are being commercialized by Sironix Renewables, Inc.

In 2016, Dauenhauer and Abdelrahman developed the acid-catalyzed dehydra-decyclization mechanism that simultaneously opens cyclic ether rings and dehydrates to synthesize diene products. This technology was subsequently used to optimize the catalytic production of isoprene, the key chemical in the production of car tires.  Subsequent research identified pathways to similarly convert biomass-derived tetrahydrofuran to butadiene and 2-methyl-tetrahydrofuran to piperylene.

Key publications include:
C.L. Williams, C.C. Chang, P. Do, N. Nikbin, S. Caratzoulas, D.G. Vlachos, R.F. Lobo, W. Fan, P.J. Dauenhauer "Cycloaddition of Biomass-Derived Furans for Catalytic Production of Renewable p-Xylene",   ACS Catalysis, 2, 6, 935–939, (2012).
Dae Sung Park, Kristeen E. Joseph, Maura Koehle, Christoph Krumm, Limin Ren, Jonathan N. Damen, Meera H. Shete, Han Seung Lee, Xiaobing Zuo, Byeongdu Lee, Wei Fan, Dionisios G. Vlachos, Raul F. Lobo, Michael Tsapatsis, Paul Dauenhauer "Tunable Oleo-Furan Surfactants by Acylation of Renewable Furans", ACS Central Science, 2(11), 820–824, (2016).
Omar A. Abdelrahman, Dae Sung Park, Katherine P Vinter, Charles S. Spanjers, Limin Ren, Hong Je Cho, Kechun Zhang, Wei Fan, Michael Tsapatsis, Paul J. Dauenhauer "Renewable Isoprene by Sequential Hydrogenation of Itaconic Acid and Dehydra-Decyclization of 3-Methyl-Tetrahydrofuran", ACS Catalysis, 7(2), 1428–1431, (2016).

Cellulose Pyrolysis
Dauenhauer's study of cellulose in 2008 led to the discovery of an intermediate liquid state of short-chain cellulose oligomers of sub-second duration at temperatures around 500 deg C.  He further outlined the challenges in understanding high temperature cellulose chemistry by publishing his "Top Ten Challenges" of biomass pyrolysis in 2012, one of which was based on his discovery of the mechanism of aerosol formation through liquid intermediate cellulose.

Dauenhauer further developed a new reactor technique called 'PHASR' (Pulse-Heated Analysis of Solid Reactions) which led to the first isothermal kinetics of cellulose conversion and product formation.  This technique permitted a molecular analysis of cellulose activation and the discovery that cellulose has a unique reaction transition at 467 deg C.  The high temperature kinetic transition was attributed to the catalytic role of chain-to-chain cellulose hydroxyl groups in stabilizing the chain fragmentation of inter-monomer bonds.

Key publications include:
Vineet Maliekkal, Saurabh Maduskar, Derek J. Saxon, Mohammadreza Nasiri, Theresa M. Reineke, Matthew Neurock, Paul Dauenhauer "Activation of Cellulose via Cooperative Hydroxyl-Catalyzed Transglycosylation of Glycosidic Bonds", ACS Catalysis, 9(3), 1943–1955, (2019).
Andrew R. Teixeira, Kyle G. Mooney, Jacob S. Kruger, C. Luke Williams, Wieslaw J. Suszynski, Lanny D. Schmidt, David P. Schmidt, and Paul J. Dauenhauer   "Aerosol generation by reactive boiling ejection of molten cellulose", Energy & Environmental Science, 4, 4306–4321, (2011).

Catalytic Resonance Theory

Catalytic resonance theory was proposed by Dauenhauer based on the Sabatier principle of catalysis developed by French chemist Paul Sabatier. Optimal catalyst performance is depicted as a 'volcano' peak using a descriptor of the chemical reaction defining different catalytic materials.  Experimental evidence of the Sabatier principle was first demonstrated by Balandin in 1960. In his initial discovery of the behavior of oscillating chemical reactions on metal surfaces, Dauenhauer showed that steady state reaction rates could achieve chemical reaction speeds as much as 1000 times greater than previously achievable rates, even with optimized catalytic systems.  This work broke down surface chemical reactions into its component parts and associated natural frequencies, which could be matched to resonate with the catalytic surface frequencies.

Follow-up work on catalytic resonance theory by Dauenhauer and his team broadened to understand the relationship between surface chemistry with its linear scaling relationships and the surface binding energy oscillation waveform. He introduced the concept of superVolcanoes as a superposition of all possible Sabatier volcanoes for varying linear scaling parameters, before further connecting the behavior of oscillating catalytic surfaces to molecular machines and pumps.

Key publications include:
A. Ardagh, O. Abdelrahman, P.J. Dauenhauer "Principles of Dynamic Heterogeneous Catalysis: Surface Resonance and Turnover Frequency Response", ACS Catalysis, 9(8), 6929–6937, (2019).
A. Ardagh, T. Birol, Q. Zhang, O. Abdelrahman, P.J. Dauenhauer "Catalytic Resonance Theory: superVolcanoes, catalytic molecular pumps, and oscillatory steady state", Catalysis Science & Technology, 9, 5058–5076, (2019).
M.A. Ardagh, M. Shetty, A. Kuznetsov, Q. Zhang, P. Christopher, D.G. Vlachos, O.A. Abdelrahman, P.J. Dauenhauer, "Catalytic Resonance Theory: Parallel Reaction Pathway Control", Chemical Science, 2020.

Advising and honors

Professor Dauenhauer has supervised 20 Ph.D. students and advised ten post-doctoral scholars.     He has published over 90 peer-reviewed papers and 10 patents.  He has given over 50 invited seminars and lectures including the Eastman Lecture at the U of California (2021), Berkeley, the Notre Dame Thiele lecture in 2017, and the Purdue Mellichamp lecture in 2016.  He has received numerous awards for his work including:

2022 - Holtz Lecture, Johns Hopkins University 
2022 - Marple-Schweitzer Lecture, Northwestern University 
2021 - Blavatnik Finalist 
2021 - Herman Pines Award 
2021 - Dourdeville Lecture, Brown University 
2020 - MacArthur Fellowship
2019 - Stratis V. Sotirchos Memorial Lectureship
2019 - Univ. of Minnesota COGS, Outstanding Advisor Award
2019 - Dept. of Energy, Top Ten EFRC Invention Award
2019 - ACS Sustainable Chemistry & Engineering Lectureship
2018 - AIChE CRE Young Investigator Award
2017 - Thiele Lecturer - Notre Dame
2016 - Rutherford Aris Award for Excellence in Reaction Engineering
2016 - Purdue University - Mellichamp Lecturer
2014 - Camille Dreyfus Teacher Scholar
2013 - DuPont Young Professor Award 
2013 - National Science Foundation, NSF- CAREER Award
2012 - U.S. Department of Energy - Early Career Award

References

External links 
Chemical Engineering & Materials Science - Univ. of Minnesota, Prof. Dauenhauer
Dauenhauer Research Group
Google Scholar - Paul Dauenhauer

American chemical engineers
Living people
American educators
American materials scientists
University of Minnesota College of Science and Engineering alumni
Minnesota CEMS
1980 births
21st-century American inventors
MacArthur Fellows
University of Wisconsin–Madison College of Engineering alumni